Robert A. Dietrich (28 March 1889 – 8 September 1947) was a German art director. He designed the sets for more than a hundred films during his career.

Selected filmography
 The Student of Prague (1913)
 The Path of Death (1917)
 When the Dead Speak (1917)
 The Spies (1919)
 The Secret of the American Docks (1919)
 The Derby (1919)
 World by the Throat (1920)
 The Woman Without a Soul (1920)
 Va banque (1920)
 Hearts are Trumps (1920)
 Nights of Terror (1921)
 Christian Wahnschaffe (1921)
 Murder Without Cause (1921)
 The Nights of Cornelis Brouwer (1921)
 To the Ladies' Paradise (1922)
 Black Monday (1922)
 At the Edge of the Great City (1922)
 Doctor Wislizenus (1924)
 Playing with Destiny (1924)
 Debit and Credit (1924)
 Wallenstein (1925)
 Neptune Bewitched (1925)
 What the Stones Tell (1925)
 A Free People (1925)
 Three Waiting Maids (1925)
 Anne-Liese of Dessau (1925)
 Father Voss (1925)
 Hussar Fever (1925)
 Trude (1926)
 Women of Passion (1926)
 Lives in Danger (1926)
 The Woman's Crusade (1926)
 Excluded from the Public (1927)
 The Man with the Counterfeit Money (1927)
 The Woman with the World Record (1927)
 The Case of Prosecutor M (1928)
 Today I Was With Frieda (1928)
 Lux, King of Criminals (1929)
 The Girl from the Provinces (1929)
 The Gypsy Chief (1929)
 The Third Confession (1929)
 Big City Children (1929)
 Marriage in Name Only (1930)
 Shadows of the Underworld (1931)
 The Theft of the Mona Lisa (1931)
 The Other Side (1931)
 Student Life in Merry Springtime (1931)
 Two Good Comrades (1933)
 The Big Chance (1934)
 The Champion of Pontresina (1934)
 The Riders of German East Africa (1934)
 Between Two Hearts (1934)
 Bashful Felix (1934)
 The Four Musketeers (1934)
 Frisians in Peril (1935)
 Miracle of Flight (1935)
 The Coral Princess (1937)
 Meiseken (1937)
 The Night of Decision (1938)
 Linen from Ireland (1939)
 Mistake of the Heart (1939)
 What Does Brigitte Want? (1941)

References

Bibliography
 Dietrich Scheunemann. Expressionist Film: New Perspectives. Camden House, 2006.

External links

1889 births
1947 deaths
German art directors
Film people from Berlin